is a railway station in the city of Gujō, Gifu Prefecture, Japan, operated by the third sector railway operator Nagaragawa Railway.

Lines

Station layout
Shizen'en-mae Station has one ground-level side platform serving a single bi-directional track. The station is unattended.

Adjacent stations

History
Shizen'en-mae Station was opened on December 11, 1986, the day that operation of the line was transferred from the Japan National Railway (JNR) to the Nagaragawa Railway.

Surrounding area
Nagara River

See also
 List of Railway Stations in Japan

References

External links

 

Railway stations in Japan opened in 1986
Railway stations in Gifu Prefecture
Stations of Nagaragawa Railway
Gujō, Gifu